The 1965 Motocross World Championship was the 9th edition of the Motocross World Championship organized by the FIM and reserved for 500cc and 250cc motorcycles.

Summary
Jeff Smith won his second consecutive 500cc motocross world championship for the BSA factory racing team with six Grand Prix victories. Paul Friedrichs took three victories to claim second place for the ČZ factory ahead of former world champion Rolf Tibblin.

Smith's win riding a BSA Victor would mark the last time that a four-stroke engine powered motorcycle would win the 500cc motocross world championship for the next several decades as, two-stroke engine technology began to dominate off-road motorcycle racing until 2003 when, mounting government environmental regulations caused the FIM implemented new rules favoring environmentally friendlier four-stroke engines. 

In the 250cc division, Russian ČZ rider Victor Arbekov won five Grand Prix races to claim the world championship ahead of the defending champion, Joël Robert.

Grands Prix

500cc

250cc

Final standings

Points are awarded to the top 6 classified finishers.

500cc

250cc

Notes

References

Motocross World Championship seasons
Motocross World Championship